was a Japanese gymnast. He competed in two events at the 1932 Summer Olympics.

References

External links
 

1908 births
1939 deaths
Japanese male artistic gymnasts
Olympic gymnasts of Japan
Gymnasts at the 1932 Summer Olympics
Place of birth missing
20th-century Japanese people